Joseph Forshaw, Jr. (May 13, 1881 – November 26, 1964) was an American athlete who competed mainly in the Marathon.

Career
Forshaw ran the Marathon in three Olympic Games. He competed for the United States in the 1908 Summer Olympics held in London, Great Britain where he won the bronze medal in the Marathon . At the 1906 Intercalated Games in Athens he finished in twelfth place, and at the 1912 Summer Olympics in Stockholm he was 10th in the event.

On May 6, 1905, Forshaw beat Sidney Hatch and Felix Carvajol to win the Missouri Athletic Club's All-Western Marathon in a time of 3:15:58. Three years later on May 2, 1908, he finished second to Hatch in the same race in 2:30:01, his best time in the event. In both races, Forshaw competed for the Missouri Athletic Club.

In March, 1912, Forshaw was one of "twenty of the best distance runners in the middle west" scheduled to participate in a 20-mile indoor marathon at Riverview Rink in Chicago, Illinois. He also finished second to Joseph Erxleben in the 25-mile Missouri Athletic Club marathon in St. Louis on May 4, 1912 to earn a spot on the United States Olympic Team.

Forshaw entered in the Missouri Athletic Club's All-Western Marathon six times between 1905 and 1912. In addition to winning in the inaugural event he came second three times and fourth twice. He reportedly finished every race in which he ever ran. After retiring from distance running he twice served as President of the Western Amateur Athletic Union.

17 years later after his death his grandson would marry the daughter of Phyllis Schlafly

References

External links

1881 births
1964 deaths
American male long-distance runners
Athletes (track and field) at the 1906 Intercalated Games
Athletes (track and field) at the 1908 Summer Olympics
Athletes (track and field) at the 1912 Summer Olympics
Olympic bronze medalists for the United States in track and field
Medalists at the 1908 Summer Olympics